Zheng Guanying Official School (EOZGY) is a primary and secondary school in Nossa Senhora de Fátima, Macau. It is named after Zheng Guanying.

, the headmistress was Wu Kit (胡潔).

History
It was known as the Escola Luso-Chinesa de Tamagnini Barbosa until 2011 when it adopted its current name.

Curriculum
Mandarin Chinese is the language of instruction of most subjects, while music and physical education are taught in Portuguese. That year, some parents on social media criticized the school, stating that the fact that students were taking different classes in different languages and that this affected the academic performances of their children. The school administration argued that the parents simply were not accustomed to the format of the school.

By 2017 the school was starting a pilot programme for bilingual Portuguese-Mandarin classes.

See also
 Escola Oficial Zheng Guanying bus stop (in Chinese)

References

External links
 Zheng Guanying Official School 
 Associação de Pais e Encarregados de Educação da Escola Primária Luso-Chinesa de Tamagnini Barbosa  / 巴波沙中葡小學家長會  - Government Printing Bureau (Imprensa Oficial, 印務局)

Schools in Macau
Secondary schools in China